Riverdale is a Canadian prime time soap opera which ran for three seasons from 1997 to 2000. The series was set in the Toronto community of Riverdale. It focused on a variety of characters and their interactions in everyday life. 94 half-hour episodes were produced.

Riverdale was developed by the producers of the British soap opera Coronation Street and produced by Epitome Pictures Inc. in association with CBC Television. Riverdale was the first soap to play in primetime on CBC since Dallas several years earlier.

Characters
 Wally Wowczuk (played by Chris Benson)
 Jimmy Snow (played by Christian Potenza)
 Maurice Long (played by Dave Nichols)
 Ben MacKenzie (played by Christopher Shyer and Hamish McEwan)
 Joan MacKenzie (played by Marion Gilsenan)
 Jerome "Tiny" Sheffield (played by Martin Roach)
 Costas Stavros (played by Paul Soles)
 Chrisa Stavros (played by Maria Ricossa)
 Patrick MacKenzie (played by Alex Campbell)
 Charles MacKenzie (played by Stewart Arnott)
 Alice Sweeney (played by Lynne Griffin)
 George Pattillo (played by Hugo Dann)
 Gordo Johnson (played by Merwin Mondesir)
 Stan Wilkes (played by Ken James)
 Gloria Wilkes (played by Jayne Eastwood)
 Jenni Hernandez (played by Yanna McIntosh)
 Mike Hayes (played by Tyrone Benskin)
 Jake Rose (played by Tom Melissis)
 Robin Hayes (played by Ashley Brown)
 Cassie Coulter (played by Melissa Thomson)
 Stephanie Long (played by Diana Reis)
 Irene Stavros (played by Melissa DiMarco)
 Caroline Walker (played by Nicole Hughes)
 Terry Walker (played by Matt Cooke)
 Michelle Martin (played by Michelle Martin and Jennifer Podemski)
 Katie MacKenzie (played by Jessica Greco)
 Shawn Ritchie (played by Kris Holden-Ried)
 Gilmour (played by Gilmour the dog)
 Doug Wilkes (played by Simon Fraser)

See also

 Degrassi (franchise)

External links
 
 Production company website

Canadian television soap operas
CBC Television original programming
1997 Canadian television series debuts
1990s Canadian drama television series
2000 Canadian television series endings
2000s Canadian drama television series
Television shows set in Toronto
Television shows filmed in Toronto